Peter John Hunt (born 2 July 1952) is an English footballer who played as a midfielder in the Football League.

References

External links
Peter Hunt's Career

1952 births
Living people
English footballers
Footballers from Stepney
Association football midfielders
Charlton Athletic F.C. players
Gillingham F.C. players
Southend United F.C. players
Ebbsfleet United F.C. players
Barking F.C. players
English Football League players